Robert Henrik Schmidt (24 April 1882 - 17 November 1941) was a Danish stage and film actor of the silent period and early sound period in Denmark.

His last film was in 1933 in the George Schnéevoigt directed film De blaa drenge in which he starred alongside Liva Weel.

Selected filmography
 David Copperfield (1922)
 The Clown (1926)
 Hotel Paradis (1931)

External links

Danish male stage actors
Danish male silent film actors
20th-century Danish male actors
Danish male film actors
Danish male actors
1882 births
1941 deaths